There are several rivers named Jacutinga River in Brazil:

 Jacutinga River (Paraná)
 Jacutinga River (Das Antas River tributary) 
 Jacutinga River (Uruguay River tributary)
 Da Jacutinga River